No. 10 Flying Training School (10 FTS) is a former Royal Air Force flying training school that operated between 1936 and 1954.

History

First formation
 1 Jan 1936 - 1 Nov 1940
Formed at RAF Ternhill and redesignated as 10 Service Flying Training School on 3 September 1939 (just after the outbreak of the Second World War). It was disbanded at Ternhill and transferred to Canada to become 32 Service Flying Training School.

Second formation
 15 Jan 1952 - 14 Apr 1954
Reformed at RAF Pershore as 10 (Advanced) Flying Training School. The school disbanded still at Pershore over two years later.

Third formation
 1 Jun 1954 – 1 Jul 1954
Reformed at RAF Merryfield as 10 FTS by redesignating 208 Advanced Flying School but disbanded one month later to become No. 9 Flying Training School RAF.

References

Citations

Bibliography

External links

10
Military units and formations established in 1936
Military units and formations disestablished in 1954